Édouard Frédéric Wilhelm Richter (18 June 1844, Paris - 4 March 1913, Paris) was a French painter who specialized in genre and Orientalist scenes.

Biography
His father was German and his mother was Dutch. He began his artistic studies at the Royal Academy of Art, The Hague, followed by studies at the Académie des Beaux-Arts in Paris with Ernest Hébert and Léon Bonnat.

After completing his studies, he remained in Paris. His first exhibition took place in 1866.

In addition to his popular Orientalist paintings, he produced numerous portraits.

Sources 
La Chronique des arts et de la curiosité, Bureaux de la Gazette des beaux-arts, 1913.

External links 

More works by Richter @ ArtNet

1844 births
1913 deaths
19th-century French painters
French genre painters
French orientalists
Painters from Paris
20th-century French painters